Primitive Plus is the official debut studio album by American hip hop musician Edan. It was released via Lewis Recordings on March 19, 2002. It peaked at number 44 on the UK Independent Albums Chart.

Critical reception

Stanton Swihart of AllMusic described the album as "a wild, weird, instantly left-field rap masterpiece from one seriously bugged-out, innovative loner." Thomas Quinlan of Exclaim! stated that it "embraces the late '80s/early '90s of hip-hop, with old school beats and battle rhymes (the Primitive), while at the same time shaking hands with new school lyricism and space age effects (the Plus)." Nathan Rabin of The A.V. Club wrote, "One of the year's most promising debuts, Primitive Plus makes the beats of yesterday and the flows of today sound like the hip-hop of tomorrow."

Track listing

Charts

References

External links
 

2002 albums
Edan (musician) albums